The Doane Tigers football team represents Doane University in the sport of American football.

References

External links